Anne Wheeler, OC, (born September 23, 1946) is a Canadian film and television writer, producer, and director.

Biography
Graduating in Mathematics from the University of Alberta she was a computer programmer before traveling abroad.  Her years of travels inspired her to become a storyteller and when she returned she joined a group of old friends to form a film collective. From 1975 to 1985 she worked for the NFB where she made her first feature film, A War Story (1981), which was about her father, Ben Wheeler and his time as a doctor in a P.O.W. camp during World War II. The war is a common theme in her work and she revisited it later in her films Bye Bye Blues (1989) and The War Between Us (1995). Her first non-NFB film was Loyalties in 1986.

In addition to her films, Wheeler has directed episodes of Anne with an E, Private Eyes, Strange Empire, The Romeo Section, The Guard, This Is Wonderland, Da Vinci's Inquest, and Cold Squad.

Awards and honors
Wheeler has been nominated four times for the Genie Award for Best Achievement in Direction for her films Loyalties (1986), Cowboys Don't Cry (1988), Bye Bye Blues (1989), and Suddenly Naked (2001). Her 1998 television miniseries, The Sleep Room, won Gemini awards for best television movie and best direction.

In 2017 Wheeler won a Leo Award for Best Direction (Television Film) for the Hallmark movie Stop the Wedding.

Wheeler was made an Officer of the Order of Canada in 1995. In 2012 she received the Queen Elizabeth II Diamond Jubilee Medal. Wheeler has also been awarded seven honorary doctorates and is the first woman to be given a Lifetime Achievement Award from the Directors Guild of Canada.

Filmography

See also
 List of female film and television directors
 List of LGBT-related films directed by women

References

External links
 Canadian Film Encyclopedia |A publication of The Film Reference Library/a division of the Toronto International Film Festival Group
 Official web site
 
 Anne Wheeler at the Canadian Women Film Directors Database

1946 births
Canadian women film directors
Canadian television directors
Canadian women television directors
Living people
Officers of the Order of Canada
Film directors from Edmonton
Writers from Edmonton
Canadian women screenwriters
Victoria School of Performing and Visual Arts alumni
Best Original Song Genie and Canadian Screen Award winners
Directors of Genie and Canadian Screen Award winners for Best Short Documentary Film
20th-century Canadian screenwriters
21st-century Canadian screenwriters
20th-century Canadian women writers
21st-century Canadian women writers
Canadian women documentary filmmakers